The 1958 Miami Redskins football team was an American football team that represented Miami University in the Mid-American Conference (MAC) during the 1958 NCAA University Division football season. In its third season under head coach John Pont, Miami compiled a 6–3 record (5–0 against MAC opponents), won the MAC championship, shut out three opponents, and outscored all opponents by a combined total of 193 to 96.

John Drew was the team captain.  The team's statistical leaders included Harold Williams with 566 rushing yards, Nick Mourouzis with 191 passing yards and Dave Girbert with 65 receiving yards.

Schedule

References

Miami
Miami RedHawks football seasons
Mid-American Conference football champion seasons
Miami Redskins football